Tough Choices may refer to:

 A memoir by CEO and 2016 US Republican Presidential Candidate Carly Fiorina
 A British Drug Interventions Programme

See also
 Choice (disambiguation)